Reedville Historic District is a national historic district located at Reedville, Northumberland County, Virginia. The district includes 64 contributing buildings in the village of Reedville.  It is an assemblage of primarily residential buildings dating to the late-19th and early-20th century during the village's predominance in the menhaden fishing industry.  Notable buildings include the Reedville Masonic Hall, Bethany Methodist Church (1899), five modified Queen Anne style houses known as "Millionaires Row," Reedville Market (the former Blundon and Hinton Department Store), Reed and Rice Store (1913), and the former People's Bank of Reedville (1910).

It was listed on the National Register of Historic Places in 1984.

References

Historic districts in Northumberland County, Virginia
Queen Anne architecture in Virginia
National Register of Historic Places in Northumberland County, Virginia
Historic districts on the National Register of Historic Places in Virginia